Inna Vladimirovna Makarova (28 July 1926 – 25 March 2020) was a Soviet and Russian actress. She grew up in Novosibirsk. In 1948 she graduated from the Gerasimov Institute of Cinematography in Moscow and began to work as an actress at the National Film Actors' Theatre. In 1949, she was awarded the Stalin Prize for her role as Lyubov Shevtsova in Sergei Gerasimov's The Young Guard. In 1985, she was awarded the designation of People's Artist of the USSR. Inna Makarova was married to Sergei Bondarchuk and is the mother of Natalya Bondarchuk.

Makarova died in Moscow on 25 March 2020 at the age of 93.

Selected filmography
 It Happened in the Donbass (1945)
 The Young Guard (1948)
 The Return of Vasili Bortnikov (1953)
 The Rumyantsev Case (1956)
 The Height (1957)
 My Beloved (1958)
 The Girls (1961)
 Balzaminov's Marriage (1964)
 The Big Ore (1964)
 Crime and Punishment (1970)
 Russian Field (1971)
 Incorrigible Liar (1973)
 It Is Not Evening Yet (1973)
 Dead Souls (1984)
 Strawberries (1996)
 Pushkin: The Last Duel (2006)
 The Mystery of the Snow Queen (2014)

References

External links

 Biography

1926 births
2020 deaths
20th-century Russian actresses
21st-century Russian actresses
Academicians of the Russian Academy of Cinema Arts and Sciences "Nika"
Gerasimov Institute of Cinematography alumni
Honored Artists of the RSFSR
People's Artists of the RSFSR
People's Artists of the USSR
Stalin Prize winners
Recipients of the Order "For Merit to the Fatherland", 4th class
Recipients of the Order of the Red Banner of Labour
Russian film actresses
Soviet film actresses
Bondarchuk family
Sergei Bondarchuk
Burials in Troyekurovskoye Cemetery